The 2011 Atlantic 10 Conference Baseball Championship was held from May 25 through 28 at Campbell's Field in Camden, New Jersey.  It featured the top six regular-season finishers of the conference's 13 teams.  Top-seeded  defeated  in the title game to win the tournament for the third time, earning the A-10's automatic bid to the 2011 NCAA Tournament.

Seeding
The league's top six teams, based on winning percentage in the 24-game regular-season schedule, were seeded one through six. The top two seeds, Charlotte and Rhode Island, received byes into the second round of play in the double elimination tournament.

Results

All-Tournament Team
The following players were named to the All-Tournament Team. Charlotte's Corey Shaylor, one of four 49ers selected, was named the Most Outstanding Player.

References

Tournament
Atlantic 10 Conference Baseball Tournament
Atlantic 10 Conference baseball tournament
Atlantic 10 Conference baseball tournament
Baseball in New Jersey
College sports in New Jersey
History of Camden, New Jersey
Sports competitions in New Jersey
Sports in Camden, New Jersey
Tourist attractions in Camden, New Jersey